Eduard Bornträger (22 June 1888 – 9 March 1958) was a German film actor.

Selected filmography
 The Hunter from Kurpfalz (1933)
 Police Report (1934)
 Lady Windermere's Fan (1935)
 The Private Life of Louis XIV (1935)
 A Woman of No Importance (1936)
 The Castle in Flanders (1936)
 Winter in the Woods (1936)
 The Impossible Woman (1936)
 Woman's Love—Woman's Suffering (1937)
 Togger (1937)
 Talking About Jacqueline (1937)
The Chief Witness (1937)
 By a Silken Thread (1938)
 The Girl of Last Night (1938)
 The Night of Decision (1938)
 Kitty and the World Conference (1939)
 We Danced Around the World (1939)
 The Life and Loves of Tschaikovsky (1939)
 Falstaff in Vienna (1940)
 Counterfeiters (1940)
 Alarm (1941)
 Diesel (1942)
 Heaven, We Inherit a Castle (1943)
 Thank You, I'm Fine (1948)

References

Bibliography
 Wolfgang Jacobsen & Hans Helmut Prinzler. Käutner. Spiess, 1992.

External links

1888 births
1958 deaths
German male film actors